House Island is a small island on the outskirts of Manchester Harbor in Manchester-by-the-Sea, Massachusetts, United States.

House Island is uninhabited; sources of the name are unconfirmed. The island has steep rocky sides and dense vegetation away inland from the steep cliffs that surround it. The island is covered in poison ivy and is not recommended for visitation.

References 

Islands of Essex County, Massachusetts
Islands of Massachusetts
Uninhabited islands of Massachusetts
Coastal islands of Massachusetts